Kevin Maxwell Warsh (born April 13, 1970) is an American financier and bank executive who served as a member of the Federal Reserve Board of Governors from 2006 to 2011. 

During and in the aftermath of the 2008 financial crisis, Warsh acted as the central bank's primary liaison to Wall Street and served as the Federal Reserve's representative to the Group of Twenty (G-20) and as the Board's emissary to the emerging and advanced economies in Asia. Prior, he served as Special Assistant to the President for Economic Policy and Executive Secretary of the White House National Economic Council. 

Warsh is currently is the Shepard Family Distinguished Visiting Fellow in Economics at Stanford University's Hoover Institution, a scholar and lecturer at the Stanford Graduate School of Business, a member of the Group of Thirty, a member of the Panel of Economic Advisers of the Congressional Budget Office, and a former steering committee member of the Bilderberg Group. He has conducted research in the field of economics and finance, and has advised several private and public companies.

Early life 
Warsh was born in Albany, New York, the youngest of three children of Judith and Robert Warsh. He was raised in nearby in Loudonville, New York and graduated from Shaker High School in Latham. Warsh is Jewish. He received an Bachelor of Arts in public policy from Stanford University in 1992 with a concentration in economics and political science. He then attended Harvard Law School and graduated cum laude with a J.D. in 1995. He also took coursework in market economics and debt capital markets at MIT Sloan School of Management and Harvard Business School.

In 2007, Warsh returned to upstate New York and spoke about serving at the Federal Reserve: "I have been honored to serve in Washington, D.C. for the past 5-1/2 years. My knowledge of the economy has deepened by working with my colleagues to put fiscal and monetary policy into practice.  Nonetheless, with each passing day, it is more obvious that I learned much of what I need to know about the real economy in my first eighteen years here in upstate New York."

Career
From 1995 to 2002, Warsh worked for Morgan Stanley in New York City, rising to executive director in the company's mergers and acquisitions department.

From 2002 to 2006, Warsh was Special Assistant to the President for Economic Policy, and Executive Secretary of the National Economic Council. His primary areas of responsibility included domestic finance, banking and securities regulatory policy, and consumer protection. He advised the President and senior administration officials on issues related to the U.S. economy, particularly fund flows in the capital markets, securities, banking, and insurance issues. Warsh participated in the President's Working Group on Financial Markets and served as the administration's chief liaison to the independent financial regulatory agencies.

Federal Reserve Board

Nomination 
President Bush nominated Warsh and Randall Kroszner to fill two Fed vacancies on January 27, 2006. Warsh's nomination drew some criticism, based on his age and inexperience.  At 35 years old, Warsh was the youngest appointment in the history of the Federal Reserve. At the time, former Fed vice chairman and Reagan appointee Preston Martin said Warsh's nomination was "not a good idea" and that if he had a voice in the Senate, he would vote no. Ben Bernanke wrote "His youth generated some criticism, including from former Board vice chairman Preston Martin, but Kevin's political and markets savvy and many contacts on Wall Street would prove to be invaluable." In his confirmation documents, Warsh listed two published writings - "Deciding to Run for Congress: An Opportunity Cost Model with Partisan Implications" and "Corporate Spinoffs and Mass Tort Liability."

At his confirmation hearing on February 14, 2006, Warsh touted his experience on Wall Street: "I hope that my prior experience on Wall Street, particularly my nearly 7 years at Morgan Stanley, would prove beneficial to the deliberations and communications of the Federal Reserve."

He took office on February 24, 2006, to fill an unexpired term ending January 31, 2018.

Pre-crisis 
His first meeting of the Federal Open Market Committee (FOMC), the Fed's policymaking body, was in March 2006. In March 2007 - less than a year before the rescue of Bear Stearns - Governor Warsh spoke about market liquidity:

The benefits of greater liquidity are substantial, through higher asset prices and more efficient transfer of funds from savers to borrowers. Historical episodes indicate, however, that markets can become far less liquid due to increases in investor risk aversion and uncertainty. While policymakers and market participants know with certainty that these episodes will occur, they must be humble in their ability to predict the timing, scope, and duration of these periods of financial distress. . . . If moored from fundamentals, confidence can give way to complacency, complacency can undermine market discipline and liquidity can falter unexpectedly. . . . [L]iquidity is significantly higher than it would otherwise be due to the proliferation of financial products and innovation by financial providers. This extraordinary growth itself is made possible by remarkable improvements in risk-management techniques. Hewing to my proposed definition, we could equally state that financial innovation has been made possible by high levels of confidence in the strength and integrity of our financial infrastructure, markets and laws. Moreover, remarkable competition among commercial banks, securities firms and other credit intermediaries have helped expand access to—and lower the all-in-cost of—credit. Interest rate risk and credit risk exposures are now more diversified. Look no further than dramatic growth of the derivatives markets. In just the past four years, notional amounts outstanding of interest rate swaps and options tripled, and outstanding credit default swaps surged more than ten-fold. These products allow investors to hedge and unwind positions easily without having to transact in cash markets, expanding the participant pool. Syndication and securitization also lead to greater risk distribution. Commercial and industrial (C&I) lending potential has expanded with the adoption of syndication practices, allowing credit risks to be spread across a greater number of participating banks and non-bank lenders. Perhaps an even more significant support for the expansion of C&I loans is the rapid growth of collateralized loan obligations (CLOs)-special purpose entities that buy C&I loans with funds raised from investors seeking different risk exposures. CLOs allow loans to be financed primarily with high-rated debt securities issued to institutions like mutual funds, pension funds, and insurance companies. Indeed, in recent years, the share of syndicated C&I term loans funded by institutional investors is estimated to have exceed that funded by commercial banks. . . . Of course, investor confidence and liquidity can shift. In the aftermath of a financial shock, if buyers and sellers can no longer agree on the distribution of possible outcomes, their ability to price transactions will be severely limited.

Financial Crisis 
Warsh played a significant role in navigating the financial market turmoil of 2007 and 2008. According to author David Wessel, "Warsh established himself as the chairman's protector in Republican circles and Bernanke's bridge to Wall Street chief executives." Bernanke would write "Don Kohn, my vice chairman, with his long experience at the Fed, and Kevin Warsh, with his many Wall Street and political contacts and his knowledge of practical finance, were my most frequent companions on the endless conference calls through which we shaped our crisis-fighting strategy."

During the crisis Warsh tried to engineer mergers between Citigroup and Goldman Sachs and Wachovia and Goldman Sachs. These efforts failed. On September 20, 2008, he was granted a waiver to deal with his former employer Morgan Stanley. The next day Morgan Stanley was converted into a bank holding company in order to access Federal Reserve loans, in effect saving the firm. According to the Wall Street Journal, "Timothy Geithner, president of the Federal Reserve Bank of New York, and Kevin Warsh, a Fed governor and former Morgan Stanley executive, worked in New York to sort out the details with Goldman and Morgan Stanley." The editors summarized the decision-making, "Mr. Warsh was part of former Fed Chairman Ben Bernanke’s inner circle during the worst of the panic. Having worked at Morgan Stanley, he provided crucial insight into the real condition of Wall Street, and well before the panic he told his Fed colleagues that the financial system was vastly undercapitalized. 'I think, most fundamentally, that the business model of investment banks has been threatened, and I suspect the existing business model will not endure through this period,' Mr. Warsh told a Fed meeting on March 18, 2008."

Warsh was tasked by Bernanke to help devise a financial reform program to mitigate the risks of future trouble. Bernanke wrote “In late 2008, amid the crisis firefighting, we at the Fed began working on our own proposals for financial reform. I wanted to have a well formulated position before the legislative debates went into high gear. Kevin Warsh led a committee of Board members and Reserve Bank presidents that laid out some key principles. Kevin’s committee considered a more explicitly 'macroprudential' or system-wide, approach to supervision and regulation. Historically, financial oversight had been almost entirely 'microprudential' – focused on the safety and soundness of individual firms, on the theory that if you take care of the trees, the forest will take care of itself. In contrast, the macroprudential approach strives for a forest-and-trees perspective.”

Throughout 2008 Warsh predicted that inflation would rise despite financial turbulence and economic weakness:

 March 2008: "On the inflation front, there is little reason to be confident that inflation will decline. There are reasons to believe that our inflation problems will become more pronounced and, I fear, more persistent."
 June 2008: "Inflation risks, in my view, continue to predominate as the greater risk to the economy."
 September 2008: "I'm still not ready to relinquish my concerns on the inflation front."

Many economists and observers, including conservatives, have argued that this focus on inflation and failure to recognize the risk of deflation significantly exacerbated the crisis. In his memoir, Chairman Bernanke writes about his frustration, "I vented in an email the next day to Don Kohn: 'I find myself conciliating holders of the unreasonable opinion that we should be tightening even as the economy and financial system are in a precarious position and inflation/commodity pressures appear to be easing.'"

Warsh's principal concerns about the permanent use of QE were highlighted in a panel discussion later alongside Bernanke. Warsh stated "My overriding concern about continued QE, then and now, involves the misallocations of capital in the economy and the misallocation of responsibility in our government. Misallocations seldom operate under their own name. They choose other names to hide behind. They tend to linger for years in plain sight. Until they emerge with force at the most inauspicious of times and do unexpected harm to the economy."

Recovery 
In September 2009, with unemployment at 9.5% and climbing, Warsh argued that the Fed should begin to pull back on its efforts to help the real economy recover: "if policymakers insist on waiting until the level of real activity has plainly and substantially returned to normal — and the economy has returned to self-sustaining trend growth — they will almost certainly have waited too long… There is a risk, of much debated magnitude, that the unusually high level of reserves, along with substantial liquid assets of the banking system, could fuel an unanticipated, excessive surge in lending." The runaway inflation he warned about never appeared. University of Oregon Professor Tim Duy wrote in response to the speech that it looked as though "monetary policymakers are more willing to use unconventional monetary policy to support Wall Street than Main Street."

At the November 2010 FOMC meeting, Warsh was extremely skeptical of the Fed's plan to generate economic activity and jobs by trying to lower long-term interest rates. Although unemployment was close to 10%, Warsh told his colleagues that he would only vote for QE2 out of respect for Chairman Bernanke: "If I were in your chair, I would not be leading the Committee in this direction, and frankly, if I were in the chair of most people around this room, I would dissent." Even if unemployment were "unacceptably high," he suggested that he would vote against the program continuing if inflation inched up a bit: "if inflation were to move up and were to be broadly consistent with the implicit inflation target [2%] in different people's minds around this room, even if unemployment were unacceptably high, I think that would be time to stop this program. If inflation expectations were to move out of the range that they have been in for a long time, that would be a reason to end this program, even if unemployment were exceptionally high and GDP were well below what we think the economy is ultimately capable of." The Federal Reserve has a legal dual mandate to pursue maximum employment as well as to ensure price stability.

He elaborated on his opposition to the program: "I think we are removing much of the burden from those that could actually help reach these objectives, particular the growth and employment objectives, and we are putting that onus strangely on ourselves rather than letting it rest where it should lie. We are too accepting of dangerous policies from others that have been long in the making, and we should put the burden on them." While Federal Reserve officials routinely offer their views on non-monetary questions such as taxes, spending and regulations, it is unusual for a Federal Reserve official to suggest that monetary support should be withheld in order to compel other branches of government to enact the Federal Reserve's favored policies.

Warsh worried about the efficacy of continuing extraordinary monetary policy accommodation. Bernanke would write of Warsh's views in the debate over QE2, "Kevin Warsh had substantial reservations. He was one of my closest advisers and confidants, and his help, especially during the height of the crisis in the fall of 2008, had been invaluable. He had supported the first round of securities purchases, begun in the midst of the crisis. Now that financial markets were functioning more normally, he believed that monetary policy was reaching its limits, that additional purchases could pose risks to inflation and financial stability, and that it was time for others in Washington to take on some of the policy burden. . . . As he had promised, Kevin voted in favor but, the following week he delivered a speech in New York and published an op-ed in the Wall Street Journal that reflected his reservations. He argued that monetary policy alone could not solve the economy's problems, and he called for tax and regulatory reforms aimed at increasing productivity and longer-term growth. I agreed that other Washington policymakers should take more responsibility for promoting economic growth. Federal spending on infrastructure projects such as road buildings, for example, could have helped make our economy more productive in the longer term while putting people back to work right away. Yet nobody expected anything to happen on the fiscal front or in other areas that Kevin highlighted, either. The reality was that the Fed was the only game in town. It was up to us to do what we could, imperfect as our tools might be. . . . I never questioned Kevin's loyalty or sincerity. He had always participated candidly and constructively, as a team player, in our deliberations. And I was grateful that he had voted for the second round of asset purchases despite his unease. I saw his public comments more as an indictment of policymakers outside the Fed than as an attack on the Fed policies. Kevin would leave the Board three months later, but not because of any policy disagreement. We had agreed when he was appointed in 2006 that he would stay for about five years. We remain close to this day.”

Warsh announced his intent to resign from the Board in a letter sent to President Obama on February 10, 2011, effective around or on March 31, 2011. When he left the Fed, CNBC's Larry Kudlow expressed disappointment and described Warsh as a "hard money hawk."

Post-FRB career 
Warsh is the Shepard Family Distinguished Visiting Fellow at Stanford University's Hoover Institution, and a scholar and lecturer at the Stanford Graduate School of Business.

He is also a member of the board of directors at UPS and is an advisory board member for Rubicon Global.

In December 2016, Warsh joined a business forum assembled by then president-elect Donald Trump to provide strategic and policy advice on economic issues.

Personal life
In 2002, Warsh married Jane Lauder, a granddaughter and heiress of Estée Lauder and long-time employee of the family business, the Estée Lauder company.
The couple lives in Manhattan. Formerly general manager of Origins, Lauder has served as the Global Brand President for Clinique since 2014. According to Forbes, her net worth as of September 27, 2017 was $2 billion. Warsh's father in law is Ronald Lauder.

In 2009, Warsh was named to Fortune Magazine's "40 under 40".

References

Further reading

Writings 
 Warsh, Kevin, and Jeb Bush. "Commentary: A New Strategy for Economic Growth." The Wall Street Journal. August 10, 2011.
 Warsh, Kevin. "Commentary: The 'Financial Repression' Trap." The Wall Street Journal. December 6, 2011.
 Warsh, Kevin, and Stanley Druckenmiller. "Commentary: The Asset-Rich, Income-Poor Economy." The Wall Street Journal. June 19, 2014.

Federal Reserve 
 Wessel, David. In Fed We Trust: Ben Bernanke's War on the Great Panic. New York: Crown Business, 2009.   "Chapter 6: The Four Musketeers: Bernanke's Brain Trust." pp. 106–115.

External links 
 Statements and Speeches of Kevin M. Warsh at FRASER
 Kevin M. Warsh at Stanford University's Hoover Institution

1970 births
20th-century American Jews
Federal Reserve System governors
Harvard Law School alumni
Lawyers from Albany, New York
Living people
Members of the Steering Committee of the Bilderberg Group
Stanford University alumni
Lauder family
George W. Bush administration personnel
Obama administration personnel
21st-century American Jews